The surname Aquino comes from one of the historic noble houses in Italy. Although Jure Francorum lived, as Benedetto Croce attests, the family was, however, of Lombard blood, as it came from Radoaldo, who had been Aquino's possessor in the time of the dukes of Benevento. The Aquinos were counted among the seven great houses of the Kingdom of Naples. Among its most prominent members, the family includes the famous saint Thomas Aquinas.

It has also been adopted elsewhere, particularly by Spaniards in Latin America and in the Philippines, to baptize local indigenous people in honor of the great theologian St. Thomas of Aquino.

Persons with the surname Aquino 
 Thomas of Aquino, Italian theologian and philosopher
 Aquino family, a political family in the Philippines
 Benigno Aquino Sr. (1894–1947), Filipino politician
 Benigno Aquino Jr. (1932–1983), Filipino politician and son of Benigno Aquino Sr.
 Benigno Aquino III (1960–2021), Filipino politician, son of Benigno Aquino Jr., and president of the Philippines
 Corazon Aquino (1933–2009), Filipina politician, wife of Benigno Aquino Jr., and president of the Philippines
 Kris Aquino (born 1971), Filipina television personality and daughter of Benigno Aquino Jr.
 Paolo Benigno "Bam" Aquino IV (born 1977), Filipino politician and cousin of Benigno Aquino III
 Angel Aquino (born 1973), Filipina actress
 Aquino de Bragança, Goan physicist
 Amy Aquino, American actress
 Anthony Aquino (born 1982), Canadian-born Italian ice hockey player
 Aristides Aquino, Dominican baseball player
 Carlo Aquino (born 1985), Filipino actor and singer
 Daniel Aquino, retired Argentine footballer
 Francesco Ferdinando d'Ávalos Aquino, Governor of the Duchy of Milan, Italy
 Giuseppe Aquino (born 1979), German-born Italian footballer
 Giuseppe Aquino (born 1983), Italian footballer
 Greg Aquino, MLB pitcher
 Javier Aquino, Mexican footballer
 Jayson Aquino, MLB pitcher
 Luis Aquino, Puerto Rican baseball player
 Michael A. Aquino, former US military officer and founder of the Temple of Set
 Michael Ray Aquino, former US intelligence officer
 Roldan Aquino (1942–2014), Filipino actor and director
 Salvatore Aquino, Italian criminal
 Sonia Aquino, Italian actress
 Ubaldo Aquino, Paraguayan football referee

References

Surnames of Italian origin
Italian-language surnames
Portuguese-language surnames
Spanish-language surnames